The architecture of Kievan Rus' comes from the medieval state of Kievan Rus' which incorporated parts of what is now modern Ukraine, Russia, and Belarus, and was centered on Kiev and Novgorod. Its architecture is the earliest period of Russian architecture, using the foundations of Byzantine culture but with great use of innovations and architectural features. Most remains are Russian Orthodox churches or parts of the gates and fortifications of cities.

After the disintegration of Kievan Rus' followed by Mongol invasion in the first half of the 13th century, the architectural tradition continued in the principalities of Novgorod, Vladimir-Suzdal, Galicia-Volhynia and eventually had direct influence on the Russian, Ukrainian, and Belarusian architecture. The Old Russian architecture of churches originates from the pre-Christian Slavic "zodching" ( - construction).

Church architecture

The great churches of Kievan Rus', built after the adoption of Christianity in 988, were the first examples of monumental architecture in the East Slavic lands. The architectural style of the Kievan state, which quickly established itself, was strongly influenced by Byzantine architecture. Early Eastern Orthodox churches were mainly made of wood with the simplest form of church becoming known as a cell church. Major cathedrals often featured scores of small domes, which led some art historians to take this as an indication of what the pagan Slavic temples should have looked like. The 10th-century Church of the Tithes in Kiev was the first cult building to be made of stone. The earliest Kievan churches were built and decorated with frescoes and mosaics by Byzantine masters.

Another great example of an early church of Kievan Rus' was the thirteen-domed Saint Sophia Cathedral in Kiev (1037–54), built by Yaroslav the Wise. Much of its exterior has been altered with time, extending over the area and eventually acquiring 25 domes.

Saint Sophia Cathedral in Novgorod (1045–1050),  on the other hand, expressed a new style that exerted a strong influence on Russian church architecture. Its austere thick walls, small narrow windows, and helmeted cupolas have much in common with the Romanesque architecture of Western Europe.

Even further departure from Byzantine models is evident in succeeding cathedrals of Novgorod: St Nicholas's (1113), St Anthony's (1117–19), and St George's (1119).  Along with cathedrals, of note was the architecture of monasteries of these times.  The 12th–13th centuries were the period of feudal division of Kievan Rus into princedoms which were in nearly permanent feud, with multiplication of cathedrals in emerging princedoms and courts of local princes (knyazes).

By the end of the 12th century, the divide of the country was final and new centers of power took the Kievan style and adopted it to their traditions. In the northern principality of Vladimir-Suzdal the local churches were built of white stone. The Suzdal style is also known as "white-stone architecture" ("белокаменное зодчество"). The first white-stone church was the St. Boris and Gleb Church commissioned by Yuri Dolgoruky, a church-fortress in Kideksha near Suzdal, at the supposed place of the stay of knyazes Boris and Gleb on their pilgrimage to Kiev. The white-stone churches mark the highest point of pre-Mongolian Rus' architecture. The most important churches in Vladimir are the Assumption Cathedral (built 1158–60, enlarged 1185–98, frescoes 1408) and St Demetrios Cathedral (built 1194–97).

In the western splinter of Kingdom of Halych-Volhynia churches in a traditional Kievan style were built for some time, but eventually the style began to drift towards Central European Romanesque tradition.

Celebrated as these structures are, the contemporaries were even more impressed by churches of Southern Rus', particularly the Svirskaya Church of Smolensk (1191–94). As southern structures were either ruined or rebuilt, restoration of their original outlook has been a source of contention between art historians. The most memorable reconstruction is the Pyatnitskaya Church (1196–99) in Chernigov (modern Chernihiv, Ukraine), by Peter Baranovsky.

Secular architecture
There were very few examples of secular (non-religious) architecture in Kievan Rus. Golden Gates of Vladimir, despite much 18th-century restoration, could be regarded as an authentic monument of the pre-Mongolian period.

In Kyiv, the capital of Ukraine, no secular monuments survived aside from pieces of walls and ruins of gates. The Golden Gates of Kyiv were destroyed completely over the years with only the ruins remaining. In the 20th century a museum was erected above the ruins, it is a close image of the gates of the Kievan Rus period but is not a monument of the time.

One of the best examples, the fortress of Bilhorod Kyivskyi, is still lying under the ground waiting major excavation.  In the 1940s, the archaeologist Nikolai Voronin discovered the well-preserved remains of Andrei Bogolyubsky's palace in Bogolyubovo, dating from 1158–65.

Examples in Russia

Examples in Ukraine

See also
 Ukrainian architecture
 List of Russian church types
 Old Russian ornament

References

External links
  Directory of Orthodox Architecture in Russia - photogallery of church architecture 

Kievan Rus culture
Architecture by region
Architectural history
Architecture in Belarus
Architecture in Russia
Architecture in Ukraine
Architecture in Kyiv